Ülo is an Estonian masculine given name. The feminine form of Ülo is Ülle.

People named Ülo include:

Ülo Jaaksoo (born 1939), computer scientist
Ülo Jõgi (1921–2007), war historian, nationalist and activist
Ülo Kaevats (born 1947), statesman, academic, and philosopher
Ülo Kesker (1934–2019), draughts player and sports journalist
Ülo Krigul (born 1978), composer
Ülo Lumiste (born 1929), mathematician
Ülo Mander (born 1954), ecologist, geographer and educator
 (born 1942), philosopher
Ülo Mattheus (born 1956), writer and journalist
Ülo Nugis (born 1944), politician and economist
Ülo Õun (1940–1988), sculptor
Ülo Pikkov (born 1976), animator, film director and producer
Ülo Raudmäe (1923–1990), conductor, composer and trombonist
Ülo Seppa (1933–2015), lawyer and agronomist
Ülo Sooster (1924–1970), painter
Ülo Tedre (1928–2015), folklorist
Ülo Tootsen (1933–2006), journalist and politician
Ülo Torpats (1920–1988), philologist and translator
Ülo Tulik (born 1957), politician 
Ülo Tuulik (born 1940), writer
Ülo Uluots (1930–1997), politician, mining engineer and military historian
Ülo Varul (1952– 2016), basketball player
Ülo Vilimaa (born 1941), dancer, choreographer, theatre director and painter
Ülo Vinter (1924–2000), composer
Ülo Voitka (born 1968), freedom fighter, forest brother, and pro-anarchist
Ülo Vooglaid (born 1935), social scientist and politician

Estonian masculine given names